Julian Scherle is a German-raised composer based in Los Angeles.

Early Life
Julian grew up in a musical family.  He has been classically trained since age six.  His father is a lute and guitar builder.  His earliest memories are him hammering away at his family's home piano. The film The Fifth Element opened up his imagination to writing music for film.

Career
Julian's early career saw him writing additional music in for many hit cable TV shows including the critically acclaimed series Mr. Robot (USA Network), Ryan Murphy’s American Horror Story (FX Network), American Crime Story: People vs. OJ (FX Network), and Scream Queens (FOX). 

Some of Julian’s theatrical credits include the award-winning drama 'Pause' directed by Tonia Mishiali and the feature film 'Princess of the Row' directed by Max Carlson & produced by Morgan Freeman. The Independent Critic says, “Julian Scherle's original score for Princess of the Row bathes the film in realism meets fantasy, capturing all the right moments of grit and wonder, truth and love.”. 

In recent years he worked on the drama film Heart of Champions directed by Michael Mailer (starring Michael Shannon) - earning him several awards and distinctions -, Buried: The 1982 Alpine Meadows Avalanche, directed by Jared Drake and Steven Siig, Sony Pictures Entertainment's Missing directed by Will Merrick & Nick Johnson and Luden, a six-part series by Amazon.

Awards
Hollywood Reel Independent Film Festival Award:  Best Score for Princess of the Row (2022)
Deep Focus Film Festival Award: Best Original Music for A Handful of Rust (2022)
Oniros Film Award: Best Original Soundtrack for Princess of the Row (2022)
Hollywood Art and Movie Award: Best Score for Heart of Champions (2022)
London City Film Award: Best Soundtrack & Music Score for Heart of Champions (2022)
Tokyo International Short Film Festival Award: Best Film Score for Heart of Champions (2022)
Los Angeles Film Award: Best Score for Princess of the Row (2021)
Roma Short Film Festival Award: Best Film Score for Heart of Champions (2021)
New York Film Award: Best Music Video Mirrors (2018)
Top Shorts Film Festival Award: Best Music Video Mirrors (2018)
International Music Video Underground Award: Best Special Stuff Mirrors (2017)

Filmography

Films
Let's Be Evil (2016)
Alt Space (2018)
Pause (2018)
Princess of the Row (2019)
Hudson (2019)
Purity Falls (2019)
Disrupted (2020)
Coming Clean (2020)
Heart of Champions (2021)
Buried: The 1982 Alpine Meadows Avalanche (2021)
Missing (2023)

Television
American Horror Story (series) (2016) additional music
Mr. Robot (series) (2016) additional music

References

External links

1985 births
German film score composers
Male film score composers
German television composers
Living people
Male television composers